Alan Maitland (1921 – February 11, 1999) was a Canadian radio broadcaster. He was a longtime host for CBC Radio, starting as an announcer in 1947 and was later cohost of As It Happens from 1974 to 1993. He was also part of the administration of CBC Radio for a brief period in 1958 between assignments as an announcer.

In his "Fireside Al" segments on As It Happens and other CBC programs ("Frontporch Al" in summer time), Maitland frequently read short stories, some of which he also published in book form. Some "Fireside Al" segments continue to air on the program to this day, particularly his Christmas Eve readings of seasonal stories, notably Frederick Forsyth's The Shepherd and O. Henry's The Gift of the Magi.

He died of heart failure due to congestive heart disease in Vancouver, British Columbia at the age of 78.

References

1921 births
1999 deaths
Canadian radio news anchors
Canadian male short story writers
Canadian talk radio hosts
CBC Radio hosts
20th-century Canadian short story writers
20th-century Canadian male writers
Canadian male non-fiction writers